AS Sucrière de La Réunion (short form: ASSUR, AS Sucrière, the first r italicized) is a Senegalese football club based in Richard Toll.

History
The club played in the top division in Senegalese football, their position in the later part were largely moderate until 2006 when the group system was in place, the club was relegated to Division 2 and returned in 2008 where they remained until 2013 when they relegated again after the club with the new name finished last, their highest position was fourth.

In cup competitions, CSS played in the Senegal FA Cup and lost the 1994 final to ASC Diaraf, their only appearance in the National Assembly Cup was in 2010 where they also lost the final.

CSS participated in the first ever League Cup in 2009 and advanced up to the Quarterfinals where they lost to Stade de Mbour, a year later, they also advanced up to the Quarterfinals and lost to ASC Diaraf, Senegal's major team.

In 2012, the club was renamed from Compagnie Sucrière Sénégalaise Richard Toll to AS Sucrière du Sénégal.

Their home stadium is Stade Municipal de Richard Toll.

Squad

League and cup history

Performance in CAF competitions

National level

Statistics
Best position: 3rd (national)
Best position at cup competitions: Second Round (continental)
Highest number of points in a season: 55 (2003-04 season)
Highest number of goals scored in a season: 35 (2005 season)
Total matches played at the continental cup competitions: 8
Total matches played at home: 4
Total matches played away: 4
Total matches played at the continental cup competitions: 8
Total number of wins at the continental cup competitions: 4
Total home wins: 2
Total away wins: 2
Total number of goals scored at the continental cup competitions: 7
Total number of goals scored at the CAF Cup: 3

Notes

External links
AS Sucrière de La Réunion at Soccerway

Football clubs in Senegal
Works association football teams